André Vacheresse (12 October 1927 in Roanne – 17 June 2000) was a player and coach for the French basketball club Chorale Roanne Basket.

Biography 
Vacheresse played for Chorale Roanne Basket from 1942 to 1962, and was the club's manager from 1977 to 1978 and its coach from 1978 to 1980. He was also a regular member of the France team with 70 caps and three titles as UFOLEP Champion of France. He won three medals at the European Championships: silver in Cairo 1949, and bronze in Paris 1951 and Moscow 1953. Vacheresse took part in the World Championships in Buenos Aires in 1950, as captain with Maurice Marcelot, and finished in sixth place, and at the Helsinki Olympics in 1952 where France finished in eighth place. 
 
He later was involved with a number of basketball stadiums, particularly Joyeuse Boule in Roanne, of which he was président.

Vacheresse died in July 2000. The town of Roanne named a new sports hall with a capacity of 3,200 seats after him on 20 January 2001.

Club 
Player
 1942 - 1962:  Chorale Roanne Basket (Nationale 1)

Coach
 1977 - 1980:  Chorale Roanne Basket (Nationale 1)

Personal honours 
In 2000, he won the Robert Busnel medal.

References

External links 
 
 Page on the Fédération Française de Basket-Ball site

French men's basketball players
French basketball coaches
1927 births
Sportspeople from Roanne
2000 deaths
Chorale Roanne Basket players
Basketball players at the 1952 Summer Olympics
Olympic basketball players of France
1950 FIBA World Championship players